Enteric ganglia may refer to:
 Submucous plexus
 Myenteric plexus